Edor "Red" Nelson (August 18, 1914 – August 27, 2014) was an athlete and sports coach at Augsburg College—now known as Augsburg University–in Minneapolis. He played baseball, football, and basketball at Augsburg before graduating in 1938. He returned to Augsburg as a coach, serving as head coach of the baseball team from 1946 to 1979, the football team from 1947 to 1969, the wrestling team from 1949 to 1963, and the men's ice hockey team during the 1956–57 season. He also served in the United States Army during World War II and served several months in German prisoner-of-war camps before escaping. After the war, he received a master's degree from the University of Minnesota in 1947. He was inducted into the Augsburg Athletics Hall of Fame in 1975. Augsburg's athletic field, Edor Nelson Field, is named in Nelson's honor.

Head coaching record

Football

References

1914 births
2014 deaths
American centenarians
American football centers
Forwards (basketball)
Augsburg Auggies baseball coaches
Augsburg Auggies baseball players
Augsburg Auggies football coaches
Augsburg Auggies football players
Augsburg Auggies men's basketball players
Augsburg Auggies men's ice hockey coaches
Fort Riley Centaurs football players
College wrestling coaches in the United States
University of Minnesota alumni
United States Army personnel of World War II
American prisoners of war in World War II
World War II prisoners of war held by Germany
People from Dawson, Minnesota
Coaches of American football from Minnesota
Players of American football from Minnesota
Baseball coaches from Minnesota
Baseball players from Minnesota
Basketball players from Minnesota